The 2001–02 Deportivo Alavés season was the club's 81st season in existence and the club's fourth consecutive season in the top flight of Spanish football. In addition to the domestic league, Alavés participated in this season's edition of the Copa del Rey. The season covered the period from 1 July 2001 to 30 June 2002.

Pre-season and friendlies

Competitions

Overview

La Liga

League table

Results summary

Results by round

Matches

Copa del Rey

References

External links

Deportivo Alavés seasons
Alavés